Craig Johnson may refer to:

Entertainment
Craig Johnson (author) (born 1961), American novelist and playwright
Craig Johnson (director), American film director and screenwriter
Craig Hella Johnson (born c. 1962), American choral conductor, composer, and arranger

Politics
Craig Johnson (Alaska politician) (born 1953), member of the Alaska House of Representatives
Craig Johnson (Iowa politician) (born 1963), member of the Iowa State Senate
Craig M. Johnson (born 1971), New York State Senator
Craig B. Johnson, mayor of Elk Grove Village, Illinois

Sports
Craig Johnson (American football) (born 1960), American football coach
Craig Johnson (ice hockey, born 1972), American ice hockey player
Craig Johnson (tennis), American tennis player

See also
Craig Johnston (born 1960), former Australian football (soccer) player